Silas Bailey ( – ) was an American educator.  He was the second president of Franklin College and the third president of Denison University. 

He graduated from Brown University in 1834, studied at Newton Theological Seminary, and was for a time a pastor in Massachusetts. He became principal of Worcester Academy about 1840, and, after several years, was elected president of Granville College, afterward Dennison University, Granville, Ohio, where he remained for ten years. He then became president of the newly established college at Franklin, Indiana, where he remained until his health failed. After filling a pastorate at Lafayette for three years he accepted the professorship of theology at Kalamazoo College, Michigan. Bailey published sermons, addresses, and reviews.

Silas Bailey died on 30 June 1874 in Paris, France.  He bequeathed his library to Franklin College.

References 

  

Created via preloaddraft
1809 births
1874 deaths
Franklin College (Indiana) faculty
Denison University faculty
Brown University alumni
Kalamazoo College faculty
People from Sterling, Massachusetts